Arriaga may refer to:

Arriaga (surname), including a list of people with the name
Arriaga-Lakua, a village in Álava, Basque Country, Spain; now part of Vitoria-Gasteiz
Arriaga Municipality, a town in Chiapas, Mexico
Ponciano Arriaga International Airport, serving San Luis Potosí, Mexico
Teatro Arriaga, an opera house in Bilbao, Spain, named for Juan Crisóstomo Arriaga